Joan S. Ash is Professor and Vice Chair, Department of Medical Informatics and Clinical Epidemiology, School of Medicine, Oregon Health & Science University (OHSU), Portland, OR. She holds master's degrees in library science Columbia University, health science (California State University, Northridge), and business administration Portland State University. Her doctorate is in Systems Science: Business Administration from Portland State. She is currently the Chair of the Board of Scientific Counselors for the Lister Hill National Center for Biomedical Communications. She has served on the Boards of Directors of the American Medical Informatics Association, the Medical Library Association, and on the United States National Library of Medicine's Biomedical Library and Informatics Review Committee.  She is co-author of Clinical Information Systems: Overcoming Adverse Consequences.

References

Living people
Health informaticians
Year of birth missing (living people)
Oregon Health & Science University faculty